IndustriALL European Trade Union is a European union federation, founded on 16 May 2012. The Union represents 7.1 million working people of nearly 200 European trade unions. It was formed by the consolidation of three former European union federations:
 EMF, European Metalworkers' Federation
 EMCEF, European Mine, Chemical and Energy Workers’ Federation
 ETUF-TCL, European Trade Union Federation - Textiles Clothing and Leather

Most IndustriALL European Trade Union affiliates are also members of the IndustriALL Global Union. Both organisations cooperate on issues of common interest.

Elected officials (2012)
 President: Michael Vassiliadis
 Vice-Presidents: Renzo Ambrosetti, Valeria Fedeli, Anders Ferbe
 General Secretary: Ulrich Eckelmann
 Deputy General Secretaries: Sylvain Lefebvre, Bart Samyn, Luc Triangle
 Auditing Committee: John Colpaert, Ortwin Magnus, Wolfgang Kienle, Walter Notredame, Annette Hellgren

External links 
IndustriALL European Trade Union

Trade unions established in 2012
European trade union federations